Mānaiakalani is a constellation in Polynesian culture which translates to "The Chief's Fishline".  It refers to the fishhook of demi-god Māui. Polynesian mythology tells of Māui pulling large fish from the ocean, representing or discovery of new islands. It is primarily made of Scorpius and the Navigator's Triangle.

References

Polynesian navigation
Polynesian culture
Constellations